The Venezuela women's national baseball team is a national team of Venezuela and is controlled by the Federación Venezolana de Béisbol. It represents the nation in women's international competition. The team is a member of the COPABE. They are currently ranked fifth (5th) in the world.

Women's Baseball World Cup

Pan American Games

 2015 Pan American Games : Third place (3rd)

Rosters

2015 Pan American Games

References 

Women's national baseball teams
Baseball